Marta Chrust-Rożej (born 29 September 1978 in Namysłów) is a retired Polish athlete who specialized in the 400 metres hurdles and 4x400 m relay.

Competition record

Personal bests
 200 metres - 24.17 s (2005)
 400 metres - 53.77 s (2004)
 100 metres hurdles - 13.59 s (2003)
 400 metres hurdles - 55.49 s (2005)

External links
 

1978 births
Living people
Polish female hurdlers
Polish female sprinters
People from Namysłów
Sportspeople from Opole Voivodeship
Universiade medalists in athletics (track and field)
Universiade silver medalists for Poland
Universiade bronze medalists for Poland
Medalists at the 2003 Summer Universiade
Medalists at the 2005 Summer Universiade